The Rio São Francisco Natural Monument is a natural monument in the states of Alagoas, Bahia and Sergipe, Brazil. It protects a section of dramatic canyons on the São Francisco River and the surrounding caatinga environment, while supporting tourism and ecotourism.

Location

The Rio São Francisco Natural Monument is in the Caatinga biome.
The conservation unit extends along both sides of the São Francisco River from the bridge between Alagoas and Bahia just below the Paulo Afonso Hydroelectric Complex to a little north of the Xingó Dam above Canindé de São Francisco.
It is in parts of the municipalities of Delmiro Gouveia, Olho d'Água do Casado and Piranhas in Alagoas, Paulo Afonso in Bahia and Canindé de São Francisco in Sergipe.

The area for the natural monument is semi-arid, with typical caatinga vegetation, and subject to desertification.
It has sandstone formations more than a billion years old, which have their own flora and endemic species.
These include the endangered blue-winged macaw (Primolius maracana) and a newly reported skink of the Mabuya genus.

Conservation

The Rio São Francisco Natural Monument was created by decree on 5 June 2009 and is administered by the federal Chico Mendes Institute for Biodiversity Conservation.
It is classed as IUCN protected area category III (natural monument or feature).
The purpose is to preserve a natural ecosystem of great ecological relevance and scenic beauty, enabling scientific research and environmental education, recreation in contact with nature and ecological tourism.

The monument protects the canyons of the São Francisco River, the reservoir of the Xingó dam and the rock sites of the Malhada Grande / Rio do Sal complex  in Paulo Afonso.
The monument did not expropriate land, and was expected to strengthen sustainable tourism and ecotourism.
Mining is allowed in the buffer zone.
Sustainable fishing and low impact agriculture can continue in areas where these activities were practised in the past, subject to the conservation unit's management plan.
Freedom of navigation in the river is maintained, also subject to the management plan.
Tourism has become a major local industry.
Tourists may take boat rides through the river's magnificent canyons.

Notes

Sources

Natural monuments of Brazil
2009 establishments in Brazil
Protected areas of Alagoas
Protected areas of Bahia
Protected areas of Sergipe